The James Blackwell House is a historic house and national historic district located near Cornwall, Granville County, North Carolina.

Description and history 
It was built about 1820, and is a -story, Georgian/Federal style dwelling. It has a hall-and-parlor plan, rests on a stone foundation, and has double shouldered stone end chimneys.

It was listed on the National Register of Historic Places on April 28, 1988.

References

Houses on the National Register of Historic Places in North Carolina
Historic districts on the National Register of Historic Places in North Carolina
Georgian architecture in North Carolina
Federal architecture in North Carolina
Houses completed in 1820
Houses in Granville County, North Carolina
National Register of Historic Places in Granville County, North Carolina